| tries = {{#expr:
 + 3 + 4 + 5 + 6 + 6 + 5 + 2 + 6
 + 7 + 6 + 1 + 3 + 2 + 7 + 5 + 6
 + 3 + 3 + 2 + 4 + 6 + 6 + 5 + 0
 + 1 + 4 + 2 + 1 + 1 + 2 + 3 + 6
 + 2 + 2 + 4 + 6 + 2 + 1 + 2 + 3
 + 3 + 4 + 2 + 5 + 1 + 4 + 7 + 5
 + 3 + 2 + 4 + 4 + 6 + 3 + 4 + 1
 + 3 + 1 + 4 + 9 + 3 + 1 + 5 + 3
 + 5 + 4 + 5 + 4 + 3 + 5 + 3 + 1
 + 3 + 3 + 3 + 1 + 8 + 2 + 3 + 2
 + 6 + 1 + 4 + 7 + 1 + 2 + 1 + 5
 + 4 + 2 + 3 + 6 + 6 + 4 + 2 + 4
 + 5 + 6 + 1 + 6 + 5 + 1 + 2 + 4
 + 3 + 3 + 4 + 4 + 6 + 3 + 0 + 1
 + 6 + 7 + 2 + 6 + 2 + 1 + 7 + 2
 + 4 + 5 + 8 + 3 + 3 + 5 + 4 + 4
 + 3 + 6 + 1 + 3 + 2 + 3 + 3
}}
| top point scorer = Dan Biggar (Ospreys)(248 points)
| top try scorer = Tim Visser (Edinburgh)(14 tries)
| website = www.rabodirectpro12.com
| prevseason = 2009–10
| nextseason = 2011–12 Pro12
}}
The 2010–11 Magners League was the tenth Celtic League season and the fifth with Magners as title sponsor. The regular season began on 3 September 2010 and finished on the weekend of 6–8 May 2011. During these stages, each team played every other team both home and away and were awarded points according to the standard bonus point system. This was the second season to follow the play-off structure to determine the Magners League champion, with the top four teams qualifying for the semi-finals. The winner of each semi final advanced to the Grand Final, which took place 28 May and was hosted by the team that finished highest in the table following the regular season. The title was won by Munster who defeated Leinster by 19–9 at Thomond Park.

This was the final season of the Celtic League sponsored by Magners. The following season would see RaboDirect, the Irish subsidiary of Dutch financial company Rabobank, take over the sponsorship. At the same time, the league rebranded itself as Pro12.

The twelve teams competing were the four Irish provinces, Munster, Leinster, Connacht and Ulster; two Scottish regions, Edinburgh Rugby and Glasgow Warriors; four Welsh regions, Cardiff Blues, Newport Gwent Dragons, Ospreys and Scarlets; and two new Italian entries Aironi and Benetton Treviso

In May 2010, the Ospreys were fined £100,000 and docked 4 points from the 2010–11 season following their postponement of the away fixture at Ulster in the 2009–10 season. However, in September 2010, following an appeal by the Ospreys, the four point deduction for the 2010–11 season was overturned, although the £100,000 fine was upheld. Instead, the four point deduction was suspended for two years.

A new broadcast deal saw games broadcast live on terrestrial television channels in Scotland and Ireland in addition to the established terrestrial coverage in Wales. The deal will be in place until the 2013–14 season.

Teams

Table

Fixtures
All times are local.

Round 1

Round 2

Round 3

Round 4

Round 5

Round 6

Round 7

Round 8

Round 9

Round 10

Round 11

1872 Cup 1st round

Round 12

1872 Cup 2nd round

Round 13

Round 14

Round 15

Round 16

Round 17

Rearranged fixtures

Round 18

Round 19

Round 20

Round 21

Rearranged fixture

Round 22

Playoffs

Semi-finals

Grand Final

Individual statistics
Note: Flags to the left of player names indicate national team as has been defined under IRB eligibility rules, or primary nationality for players who have not yet earned international caps. Players may hold one or more non-IRB nationalities.

Top points scorers

Top try scorers

Notes

Television coverage
Coverage moved back to free to air television. Ulster's matches were televised only in Northern Ireland on BBC Two Northern Ireland apart from their away matches in Aironi, Cardiff Blues, Ospreys and Newport Gwent Dragons. They also televised the Round 10 match between Scarlets vs Leinster as a replacement for the scheduled Ulster vs Newport Gwent Dragons match which was postponed.

References

 
   
2010-11
2010–11 in Irish rugby union
2010–11 in Welsh rugby union
2010–11 in Scottish rugby union
2010–11 in Italian rugby union